The Lithuanian men's national under 20 ice hockey team is the national under-20 ice hockey team in Lithuania. The team represents Lithuania at the International Ice Hockey Federation's IIHF World U20 Championship.

International competitions

References

Ice hockey teams in Lithuania
Junior national ice hockey teams
Ice hockey